Andréa Librici (born 9 December 2004) is a Belgian professional footballer who plays for Sint-Truidense.

Club career 
Born in Liège, Andréa Librici first played with some local clubs, before joining Sint-Truidense as a 9-year-old. He spent all his youth years with the club from Limburg —except a hiatus at OH Leuven between 2019 and 2021—before entering the first team during the 2022 pre-season.

Librici made his professional debut for Sint-Truidense on 30 July 2022, replacing Shinji Kagawa during a 1–1 away draw to Gent. The following week, he signed his first professional contract with the club.

References

External links

2004 births
Living people
Belgian footballers
Belgium youth international footballers
Association football midfielders
Footballers from Liège
Sint-Truidense V.V. players
Belgian Pro League players
Belgian people of Italian descent
Oud-Heverlee Leuven players